Zhicheng is a town in Yidu County-level city, Yichang Prefecture-level city, Hubei Province, China. It is situated on the right (southern) shore of the Yangtze River, some 15 km southeast from downtown Yidu.

As of 2005, it had a population of 159,000. 

Zhicheng has one Yangtze River crossing, the Zhicheng Yangtze River Bridge, which connects Zhicheng with Gujiadian Town (顾家店镇), of Zhijiang city, on the north side of the river. The bridge carries the Jiaozuo–Liuzhou Railway and a provincial highway.

Administrative divisions
Four residential communities:
 Jiefanglu, Datong, Yangxi, Xihu

Twenty-eight villages:
 Jiaguoshan, Lijiaping, Shuijingping, Zhifangchong, Liulichong, Zhongjiachong, Yangxi, Heyangdian, Huilongdang, Guandang, Guanping, Wufengshan, Baishuigang, Sanbanhu, Jiudaohe, Dayan, Yujiaqiao, Quanshuihe, Chixihe, Quanxinfan, Yangjinfan, Yanjiang, Huancheng, Yangheling, Xiejiachong, Louzihe, Liangjiafan, Longwangtai

See also
List of township-level divisions of Hubei

References

Geography of Yichang
Township-level divisions of Hubei